Parliamentary elections were held in Lebowa on 16 March 1983. The Lebowa People’s Party won more than 75% of the 40 elected seats in the Legislative Assembly.

Electoral system
The Lebowa Legislative Assembly consisted of 100 seats, only 40 of which were elected.

References

Lebowa
Elections in South African bantustans
Lebowa